Bruce Gordon (November 14, 1962 – September 29, 2017) served as Saskatoon Detective Sargeant for the Saskatoon Police Service in the Sex Crimes Unit as wells as Major Crime/Homicide Unit.  Gordon was an all round athlete, Director of Investigations, and graduated from the University of Saskatchewan College Of Law in 2016 shortly before his passing.

Early life
Gordon grew up on a farm near Marsden, Saskatchewan.

Later years
Gordon was a forward with the Saskatoon Blades and Medicine Hat Tigers, an active hockey player who became the Saskatoon Blades captain during the beginning of the 1980s.  Gordon also coached midget hockey.  Before his passing Gordon was honoured with a Bruce Gordon banner in the SaskTel Centre, and players adorned their hockey helmets with #BeLikeBruce stickers.  Additionally at the season home opener - featuring the two teams Gordon played for, theBlades and Tigers, the "Cops for Cancer" fundraiser raised money in the name of Gordon towards cancer research.

Gordon was also active as a swimmer, weight lifter, cyclist.  As a Crossfit training and national Crossfit competitions such as the CanWest Games a British Columbia CrossFit competition, marathons,  competing in triathlons as well as the Ironman, such as the Penticton Ironman which he completed nine times.  In 2019, Crossfit 306 held the #BeLikeBruce Fitness Festival combining CrossFit Competition with a Triathlon in honour of Gordon, and raised $15,000 towards Pancreatic Cancer Research. Additionally Gordon was active in bike races.  In the last days of Stage 4 Pancreatic Cancer, hundreds of people came to Saskatoon's Avalon Park in a cross-fit flash workout to honour Gordon.

Besides being an active athlete, Gordon started out in C Platoon with the Saskatoon Police Service before moving up through the Saskatoon Police Service as Saskatoon Detective Sergeant for in the Sex Crimes Unite as wells as Major Crime/Homicide Unit.  Gordon was honoured in 2004 with the Exemplary Service Medal, and again honoured in 2021 with the Chief's Award of Excellence.

Then Gordon turned to a career as detective of investigations in British Columbia for the inaugural civilian oversight of police officers.

Following his stay in British Columbia, Gordon returned to school to study law to become a defence lawyer at the University of Saskatchewan.  As a student, Gordon kept active with the College of Physicians and Surgeons of Saskatchewan as well as the Saskatchewan Human Rights Commission.  Gordon graduated in 2016 at a special ceremony called early at Saskatoon's Court of Queen's Bench and was called to the bar in the spring of 2017, and served with Cuelenaere LLP. At the same time as Gordon was called to the bar, his wife Chris graduated from the Edward's School of Business.  Police Chief Clive Weighill made an announcement at the special ceremony held to call Gordon to the bar.  In tribute to Bruce Gordon, the Saskatoon Police gym will be named after Bruce Gordon, the Bruce Gordon Physical Fitness Centre.

World Pancreatic Day on November 19 is honoured with the #BeLikeBruce Memorial Pancreatic Cancer Research Fund established by his family which is housed at the College of Medicine, University of Saskatchewan.

In recognition of his contributions to the community, Gordon was bestowed the Saskatoon-Grasswood Canada 150 Award. In addition to his career and dedication to the athletic community Gordon was a volunteer, and offered his time to PRIDE Saskatoon, the Saskatoon Road Runners Club, John Lake Home and School Council, and the Saskatoon Sexual Assault Centre and may other local organisations.

References

	

1962 births
2017 deaths
Canadian police chiefs